Graeme John Davison,  (born 1940) is an Australian historian who is the Sir John Monash Distinguished Professor in the School of Historical Studies at Monash University, Melbourne, Australia. He is best known for his work on Australian urban history. Davison won the prestigious Ernest Scott Prize in 1979 for The Rise and Fall of Marvellous Melbourne.

Early life and education
Davison was born to a Methodist family that viewed itself as being of "modest respectability".

Davison received a Bachelor of Arts from the University of Melbourne and then attended the University of Oxford as part of his Rhodes Scholarship. Returned to Australia in the mid-1960s, Davison received his PhD from the Australian National University in 1969 for his thesis,The Rise and Fall of "Marvellous Melbourne" 1880–1895 under the supervision of John Andrew La Nauze and F. B. Smith. He was married by the time he completed his thesis.

Academic career 

Davison turned his doctoral thesis into a book in 1979, which won the Ernest Scott Prize. His supervisor, La Nauze, had won the same prize for a second time in 1973. After teaching at Melbourne University, Davison began lecturing at Monash University in 1982 as the Sir John Monash Distinguished Professor in the School of Historical Studies.

In his academic career Davison has written or co-written over ten books, over 30 peer-reviewed articles, 28 book chapters and edited three books. He has developed a reputation as "one of Australia’s leading experts on the elusive notion of national identity". He is often interviewed and his work is quoted in the news media on topics ranging from rural history to the history of home ownership.

Bibliography

Author

References

Living people
20th-century Australian historians
Historians of Australia
University of Melbourne alumni
Alumni of the University of Oxford
Australian National University alumni
1940 births
Officers of the Order of Australia
21st-century Australian historians
Writers from Melbourne